Yoo Yeon-seung (born 21 December 1991) is a South Korean footballer who plays as a midfielder for Yangju Citizen FC in the K3 League.

Career
Yoo was selected by Daejeon Citizen in the 2014 K League draft.

References

External links 

1991 births
Living people
Association football midfielders
South Korean footballers
Daejeon Hana Citizen FC players
Ulsan Hyundai Mipo Dockyard FC players
Ansan Greeners FC players
FC Anyang players
K League 1 players
K League 2 players
Korea National League players